The broom hare (Lepus castroviejoi) is a species of hare endemic to northern Spain.

Distribution and habitat
It is restricted to the Cantabrian Mountains in northern Spain between the Serra dos Ancares and the Sierra de Peña Labra. Its preferred habitat is heathland, containing mainly Erica, Calluna, and Vaccinium, with much shrub cover of Cytisus, Genista, and Juniperus. It also inhabits clearings in mixed deciduous forests of oak and beech.

Description
The fur of the broom hare is a mixture of brown and black, with very little white on the upper part of the body. The underside of the body is all white. The top of the tail is black, while the underside of the tail matches the body in being white. The ears are brownish-gray and are usually black-tipped.

Taxonomy
The species was only described as distinct in 1976; previously, it had not been distinguished from the Granada hare. Little is known about the feeding, reproductive, or behavioural habits of the broom hare, but they are believed to be similar to those of the Granada hare.

Human interaction and impact
The broom hare is listed on the IUCN's Red List of Threatened Species as vulnerable. The major threat listed to their status is hunting. Hunting them is excessive in many areas they inhabit, especially when the hares are isolated during the winter.

References

Lepus
Endemic mammals of the Iberian Peninsula
Vulnerable animals
Vulnerable biota of Europe
Mammals described in 1976
Mammals of Europe